Inowrocław Voivodeship was a unit of administrative division and local government in Poland from the 14th century to the First Partition of Poland in 1772. Together with the neighbouring Brześć Kujawski Voivodeship it was part of the Kuyavia region and the Greater Polish prowincja.

With size of some 2,900 km2 (together with Dobrzyn Land, its area was 5,877 km2.), it was one of the smallest voivodeships of the Polish–Lithuanian Commonwealth. In early years after its creation (14th century), it was called Gniewkowo Voivodeship (Województwo gniewkowskie), from the town of Gniewkowo, the seat of local Piast princes. Last mention of Gniewkowo Voivodeship was in 1420. Even though the capital of the voivodeship was in Inowrocław, its biggest urban center was Bydgoszcz. Local sejmiks, together with Brzesc Kujawski Voivodeship, took place in Radziejow. The Inowroclaw Voivodeship with Dobrzyn Land had six senators (Voivode and Castellan of Inowroclaw, Castellan of Bydgoszcz, and Castellans of Dobrzyn, Rypin and Slonsk Dolny).

Apart from the original two Kuyavian counties of the Voivodeship, it also included the Dobrzyn Land, located on eastern bank of the Vistula which became part of the Kingdom of Poland in 1466. The Dobrzyn Land was divided into three counties  (Dobrzyń, Rypin, Lipno), and had its own sejmiks at Lipno.

Governor seat:
 Inowrocław

Voivodes: Hieronim Radomicki (1630–1651)

Regional council (sejmik) seats:
 Radziejow
 Lipno

Administrative division:
 County of Inowrocław
 County of Bydgoszcz
 Land of Dobrzyń (ziemia dobrzyńska), divided into the counties of Dobrzyń, Rypin, and Lipno.

Neighbouring Voivodeships:
 Pomeranian Voivodeship
 Chełmno Voivodeship
 Płock Voivodeship
 Brześć Kujawski Voivodeship
 Kalisz Voivodeship
 Gniezno Voivodeship (since 1768)

Sources 

 

Voivodeships of the Polish–Lithuanian Commonwealth
14th-century establishments in Poland
1772 disestablishments in the Polish–Lithuanian Commonwealth